Melanoliarus placitus is a species of cixiid planthopper in the family Cixiidae.

References

Further reading

External links

 

Insects described in 1912
Pentastirini